Nathan Bryan "Nate" Oman (born 1975) is the Rollins Professor of Law at the law school of the College of William and Mary. He is a legal scholar and educator. In 2006, he became an assistant professor at The College of William & Mary Law School. In 2003, Oman founded Times & Seasons, An Onymous Mormon Blog.

Biography 
Oman was raised in Salt Lake City, Utah.  He served a mission for the LDS Church in the Korea Pusan Mission.

Oman holds a B.A. degree in political science from Brigham Young University and a J.D. degree from Harvard Law School.

He worked on the staff of Senator Mitch McConnell before going to law school.  He clerked for Judge Morris S. Arnold.

Prior to joining the faculty of William and Mary Oman was a practicing lawyer in Washington, D.C.  Oman has been a visiting professor at Hebrew University, Cornell Law School, and the University of Richmond Law School.

Oman is a Mormon.  He is a son of Richard G. Oman, an art curator at the LDS Church History Museum and an expert on LDS art. His mother is Susan Staker, retired, former editorial director at Adobe Systems and editor for Sunstone magazine and Signature Books.

Oman and his wife, the former Heather Bennett, are the parents of two children.

Writings 
Oman specializes in contract law, the foundations of private law, and law and religion. Oman's work has appeared in such law journals as the Harvard Law Review, Michigan Law Review, Georgetown Law Journal, Minnesota Law Review, Iowa Law Review, and BYU Law Review. He has also been a frequent presenter at conferences of the J. Reuben Clark Law Society.
 
He wrote an article on the 2008 Mitt Romney presidential campaign for the San Francisco Chronicle.  In addition, he has published op-eds in The National Review On-line, The Washington Times, and The Richmond-Times Dispatch.  Since late 2010 he has been a regular columnist for the Deseret News.

In late 2010 Oman criticized the U.S. auto bailout: "Taxpayer money became vital to GM's and Chrysler's continued survival precisely because the presence of taxpayer money understandably scared away private investors. ... [The two auto giants] could have gone through bankruptcy like everyone else. It did, however, undermine the trust on which successful capitalism depends."

Oman has written on many themes related to Mormon studies, contributing to Dialogue: A Journal of Mormon Thought, the FARMS Review, BYU Studies, Element: The Journal of the Society for Mormon Philosophy and Theology and wrote articles on legal themes for Mormonism: A Historical Encyclopedia and contributed the article on Mormons for the forthcoming Encyclopedia of the Supreme Court of the United States.

Oman along with Alan Meese wrote for the Harvard Law Review Forum an in-depth analysis of Burwell v. Hobby Lobby and the question of whether the Religious Freedom Restoration Act should apply, arguing that actions of corporations are within the intended scope of religious freedom.

Another recent work by Oman was International Legal Experience and the Mormon Theology of the State, 1945–2012 published in the Iowa Law Review.

Oman is the author of The Dignity of Commerce: Markets and the Moral Foundations of Contract Law published by the University of Chicago Press.

California Appellate Law Group's Anna-Rose Mathieson and Oman co-authored a friend-of-the-court briefs signed by Oman and twenty additional Mormon studies scholars and filed with the U.S. Supreme Court with regard to the Court's review of the Trump Administration's travel bans. The brief draws parallels between historical U.S. government-sanctioned and promoted anti-Mormon with the anti-Muslim atmosphere surrounding the proposed ban currently.

References

External links
 
  
 

1975 births
American bloggers
American Latter Day Saint writers
American lawyers
Brigham Young University alumni
Cornell University faculty
Harvard Law School alumni
Historians of the Latter Day Saint movement
Living people
Mormon bloggers
American Mormon missionaries in South Korea
Mormon studies scholars
Writers from Salt Lake City
College of William & Mary faculty
University of Richmond faculty
20th-century Mormon missionaries
Latter Day Saints from Utah
Latter Day Saints from Virginia
21st-century American non-fiction writers